The Provincial Government of the Autonomous Province of Vojvodina is the executive organ of the Autonomous Province of Vojvodina, within the Republic of Serbia. For its actions it is accountable to the Assembly of Vojvodina. The rights and duties of the government are laid down by the Constitution of Serbia and by the Statute of the Autonomous Province of Vojvodina as its supreme legal act.

Competences
In the past years the government has undertaken a wide range of intensive activities aimed at regaining the competencies of the province, making a survey of the situation in all fields and undertaking measures to develop the provincial economy and agriculture. It has encouraged consolidation of economic and financial trends in the province, the increase in the standard of living, the advancement of health care, education, culture and a greater implementation of minority rights of all national communities. The aim has also been to develop sociological, cultural and other characteristics of the province.

Current Government

Former governments

2008–2012

2012–2014

2014–2016

2016–2020

Building

The building, known as Banovina Palace, is the seat of the Government of the Autonomous Province of Vojvodina. The building is located in Novi Sad, the administrative seat of Vojvodina.

Before World War II, it was the administration centre of the Danube Banovina (or Banate of Danube) of the Kingdom of Yugoslavia and residence of the Ban of Danube, who ruled over the Danube Banovina.

See also
 Politics of Vojvodina
 Politics of Serbia
 Government of Serbia

External links
 Official website 

τ
Politics of Vojvodina
Vojvodina